General elections were held in Argentina on 11 November 1951. Voters chose both the President of Argentina and their legislators. This was the first election in the country to have enfranchised women at the national level. Turnout was around 88%.

Background
President Juan Perón (1895–1974) had become President for the first time in June 1946. His popularity was riding high following five years of social reforms and a vigorous public works program, but he faced intensifying opposition during 1951.  His decision to expropriate the conservative La Prensa (then the nation's second-most circulated daily), though lauded by the CGT labor union, damaged his standing elsewhere at home and his reputation in other countries, as did the climate of political liberties: the opposition UCR's nominee, Congressman Ricardo Balbín, had spent much of the previous year as a political prisoner. Economically, the year was an improvement over the 1949–50 recession and saw the completion of a number of landmark public works and the inaugural of Channel 13 (Public Television), the first regular broadcast station in Latin America; but growing inflation (50%, a record at the time) led to increasing strike activity.

The UCR and other parties in opposition, harassed and deprived of access to the media, boycotted a number of Congressional races and all Senate races as well. The vice president, Hortensio Quijano, had requested leave from the campaign due to failing health and, on August 22, the CGT organized a rally on Buenos Aires' massive Ninth of July Avenue in support of the influential first lady Eva Perón as her husband's running mate, though unbeknownst to the crowd, the popular Evita was, like Quijano, dying, and thus refused the acclamation. Quijano reluctantly stayed on; but his stepping aside did not prevent a September 28 coup attempt against Perón on the part of ultraconservative elements in the Army. Ultimately, these ill-considered attacks, the Peróns' popularity and their control of much of the media combined to give the Peronist Party a landslide in the election, the first at the national level in which the vote was extended to women.

Candidates
Peronist Party: President Juan Perón of Buenos Aires Province
Radical Civic Union: Congressman Ricardo Balbín of Buenos Aires Province

Results

President

Chamber of Deputies

Senate

Provincial Governors

Footnotes 

Elections in Argentina
1951 elections in Argentina
1951
November 1951 events in South America